Marthal is a medium village in the southern part of India.

Marthal village may look as medium and you may find nothing important in this.  But it is a historical place. Once named as Marthanda Naloor.  The village has temples that convey the message of being a great place, once.  Graveyards are the main thing that is in the middle of this village.  It has a Matriculation school and it is 100% literate village.  It is a very scenic place and it is surrounded by Green paddy fields.  You may clearly see that this village is between two mountains, ideally, we can call this a valley. The nearby small town is [Thittuvilai].  More than 50% of the people are Muslims.  This village has two churches St Assisi Church and another Church of South India church.

As per the history of the village, a man named Devadhas Nadar was powerful, good man and once he was the owner of the majority of lands there his descendants subsequently lose power, and wealth and still live there outside the village.  The other great name [Jeevanadham], a great communist leader was born in the nearby town of Boothapandi.

This scenic village is near to the Mukkadal Dam. This village surrounded by ponds and paddy fields.

Villages in Kanyakumari district